The following is an overview of events in 1986 in film, including the highest-grossing films, award ceremonies and festivals, a list of films released and notable deaths.

Highest-grossing films (U.S.)

The top ten 1986 released films by box office gross in North America are as follows:

Events
 February 3 - Pixar Animation Studios is founded by Edwin Catmull and Alvy Ray Smith.
 April - Guy McElwaine resigns as head of Columbia Pictures.
 April 26 - Actor Arnold Schwarzenegger marries television journalist Maria Shriver.
 June - First Midnight Sun Film Festival in Sodankylä, Finnish Lapland.
July 2 - The Great Mouse Detective is released to theaters to positive reviews and is a critical and financial success, just behind An American Tail, saving the Disney Studio from bankruptcy after the failure of The Black Cauldron. It is now regarded as one of the darkest and underrated classics of all time, and has gained a cult following.
 August 6 - Timothy Dalton is officially announced as the fourth actor to portray James Bond.
 September - David Puttnam becomes head of Columbia Pictures.
 September 13 - Film review television program Siskel & Ebert premieres in syndication. Although the two critics have been working as a pair since 1975, this will be their longest running program and will run in various incarnations until 2010.
 November 21 - The first animated film produced by Steven Spielberg, An American Tail, is released, and breaks the record once held by Disney's The Rescuers for the largest financial amount made for an animated film on opening weekend.
 November 29
 Actor Cary Grant dies of a cerebral hemorrhage in Davenport, Iowa.
 Stuntman Dar Robinson is killed on the set of the film Million Dollar Mystery.

Awards 
{| class="wikitable" style="font-size: 90%;"
|-
! rowspan="2" style="width:200px;"| Category/Organization !! colspan="2" style="width:250px;"| 44th Golden Globe AwardsJanuary 31, 1987 !! rowspan="2" style="width:250px;"| 40th BAFTA AwardsFebruary 22, 1987 !! rowspan="2" style="width:250px;"| 59th Academy AwardsMarch 30, 1987
|-
! width=200| Drama !! style="width:200px;"| Comedy or Musical
|-
| Best Film || Platoon || Hannah and Her Sisters || A Room with a View|| Platoon
|-
| Best Director || colspan=2| Oliver StonePlatoon || Woody AllenHannah and Her Sisters || Oliver StonePlatoon
|-
| Best Actor || Bob HoskinsMona Lisa || Paul HoganCrocodile Dundee || Bob HoskinsMona Lisa || Paul NewmanThe Color of Money
|-
| Best Actress || Marlee MatlinChildren of a Lesser God || Sissy SpacekCrimes of the Heart || Maggie SmithA Room with a View || Marlee MatlinChildren of a Lesser God
|-
| Best Supporting Actor || colspan=2| Tom BerengerPlatoon || Ray McAnallyThe Mission || Michael CaineHannah and Her Sisters
|-
| Best Supporting Actress || colspan=2| Maggie SmithA Room with a View || Judi DenchA Room with a View|| Dianne WiestHannah and Her Sisters
|-
| Best Screenplay, Adapted || rowspan=2 colspan=2| The MissionRobert Bolt || Out of AfricaKurt Luedtke ||A Room with a ViewRuth Prawer Jhabvala
|-
| Best Screenplay, Original || Hannah and Her SistersWoody Allen || Hannah and Her SistersWoody Allen
|-
| Best Original Score || colspan="3" | Ennio MorriconeThe Mission || Herbie HancockRound Midnight
|-
| Best Original Song || colspan="2" | "Take My Breath Away"Top Gun || N/A || "Take My Breath Away"Top Gun
|-
| Best Foreign Language Film || colspan=2| The Assault(De Aanslag) || Ran(Ran) || The Assault(De Aanslag)
|}Palme d'Or (Cannes Film Festival):The Mission, directed by Roland Joffé, United KingdomGolden Lion (Venice Film Festival):The Green Ray (Le Rayon vert), directed by Éric Rohmer, FranceGolden Bear (Berlin Film Festival):Stammheim', directed by Reinhard Hauff, West Germany

1986 Wide-release films in the U.S.

January–March

April–June

July–September

October–December

Notable films released in 1986
United States unless stated

#8 Million Ways to Die, directed by Hal Ashby, starring Jeff Bridges, Rosanna Arquette, Alexandra Paul, Andy García9½ Weeks, directed by Adrian Lyne, starring Kim Basinger and Mickey Rourke52 Pick-Up, directed by John Frankenheimer, starring Roy Scheider, John Glover, Clarence Williams III, Vanity, Ann-Margret

AAakhree Raasta (The Last Option), starring Amitabh Bachchan - (India)Abel, directed by and starring Alex van Warmerdam - (Netherlands)About Last Night, directed by Edward Zwick, starring Rob Lowe, Demi Moore, James Belushi, Elizabeth PerkinsAbsolute Beginners, directed by Julien Temple, starring David Bowie and Patsy Kensit - (U.K.)The Adventure of Faustus Bidgood - (Canada)The Adventures of Milo and Otis (Koneko monogatari) - (Japan)The Adventures of the American Rabbit - (United States/Japan)The AIDS ShowAlex Holeh Ahavah (Alex is Lovesick) - (Israel)Aliens, directed by James Cameron, starring Sigourney Weaver, Michael Biehn, Bill Paxton, Lance Henriksen, Jenette Goldstein, Paul ReiserAllan Quatermain and the Lost City of Gold, directed by Gary Nelson, starring Richard Chamberlain, Sharon Stone, James Earl Jones, Henry Silva, and Robert DonnerLos Amantes del Señor de la Noche (The Lovers of the Lord of the Night) - (Mexico)American Anthem, starring Mitch Gaylord and Janet JonesAn American Tail, directed by Don Bluth with the voices of Phillip Glasser and Dom DeLuiseEl Amor brujo (a.k.a. Wedded by Witchcraft), directed by Carlos Saura - (Spain)Amorosa, directed by Mai Zetterling - (Sweden)April Fool's Day, starring Jay Baker and Deborah ForemanArmed and Dangerous, starring John Candy, Eugene Levy, Meg RyanArmed Response, starring David Carradine and Lee Van CleefArmour of God (Long xiong hu di), starring Jackie Chan - (Hong Kong)As Is, directed by Michael Lindsay-Hogg, starring Colleen Dewhurst, Robert Carradine, Jonathan HadaryThe Assault (De aanslag) - Academy and Golden Globe Awards for Best Foreign Language Film, Golden Space Needle award - (Netherlands)At Close Range, starring Sean Penn, Christopher Walken, Mary Stuart Masterson, Chris PennAttention bandits!, aka Bandits, directed by Claude Lelouch (France)Avenging Force, starring Michael Dudikoff

BBabaKiueria - (Australia)Back to School, starring Rodney Dangerfield, Sally Kellerman, Keith Gordon, Adrienne Barbeau, Burt Young, Ned Beatty, Robert Downey, Jr.Backlash - (Australia)Band of the Hand, starring Stephen Lang and Lauren HollyThe Beekeeper (O Melissokomos) - (Greece)Behind Enemy Lines, starring David CarradineThe Best of Times, starring Robin Williams and Kurt RussellA Better Tomorrow (Jing hung bun sik), directed by John Woo, starring Chow Yun-fat and Leslie Cheung - (Hong Kong)Betty Blue (37°2 le matin), directed by Jean-Jacques Beineix, starring Béatrice Dalle - Golden Needle award for 1992 - (France)Biggles: Adventures in TimeThe Big Parade (Dà Yuèbīng), directed by Chen Kaige - (China)Big Trouble, directed by John Cassavetes, starring Peter Falk, Alan Arkin, Beverly D'Angelo, Valerie CurtinBig Trouble in Little China, directed by John Carpenter, starring Kurt Russell, Kim Cattrall, Dennis Dun, James Hong, Victor WongBlack Moon Rising, starring Tommy Lee Jones and Linda HamiltonBlue City, starring Judd Nelson and Ally SheedyBlue Velvet, directed by David Lynch, starring Kyle MacLachlan, Isabella Rossellini, Dennis Hopper, Laura Dern, Hope LangeBoris Godunov, directed by Sergei Bondarchuk - (U.S.S.R.)The Boy Who Could Fly, directed by Nick Castle, starring Lucy Deakins and Jay UnderwoodBrighton Beach Memoirs, directed by Gene Saks, starring Jonathan Silverman, Blythe Danner, Bob Dishy, Judith IveyBullies - (Canada)By Touch (Przez dotyk) - (Poland)

CIl camorrista (The Professor), starring Ben Gazzara - (Italy)Care Bears Movie II: A New Generation, starring Alyson Court, Cree Summer, Hadley Kay - (Canada)Caravaggio, directed by Derek Jarman, starring Nigel Terry, Sean Bean, Tilda Swinton - (U.K.)Castaway, directed by Nicolas Roeg, starring Amanda Donohoe and Oliver Reed - (U.K.)Cat City (Macskafogó) - (Hungary)Children of a Lesser God, directed by Randa Haines, starring William Hurt, Marlee Matlin, Piper LaurieChoke Canyon a.k.a. On Dangerous GroundThe Clan of the Cave Bear, starring Daryl HannahClockwise, starring John Cleese - (U.K.)Club Paradise, directed by Harold Ramis, starring Robin Williams, Jimmy Cliff, Peter O'Toole, Rick Moranis, Eugene LevyCobra, starring Sylvester Stallone, Brigitte Nielsen, Reni Santoni, Andrew Robinson, Brian ThompsonThe Color of Money, directed by Martin Scorsese, starring Paul Newman, Tom Cruise, Mary Elizabeth Mastrantonio, Helen Shaver, John Turturro, Forest WhitakerComrades, starring Keith Allen - (U.K.)Crawlspace, starring Klaus KinskiCrimes of the Heart, directed by Bruce Beresford, starring Diane Keaton, Jessica Lange, Sissy Spacek, Tess HarperCritters, starring  Dee Wallace-Stone and M. Emmet WalshCrocodile Dundee, directed by Peter Faiman, starring Paul Hogan and Linda Kozlowski - (Australia)

DDangerously Close, starring John StockwellDead Man's Folly, starring Peter Ustinov, Jean Stapleton, Nicollette SheridanDead Man's Letters (Pisma myortvogo cheloveka) - (U.S.S.R.)Deadly Friend , directed by Wes CravenLe Déclin de l'empire américain, (The Decline of the American Empire), written and directed by Denys Arcand - (Canada)The Delta Force, starring Chuck Norris and Lee MarvinDesert Bloom, starring Jon Voight, JoBeth Williams, Annabeth Gish, Ellen BarkinDown and Out in Beverly Hills, directed by Paul Mazursky, starring Nick Nolte, Bette Midler, Richard DreyfussDown by Law, directed by Jim Jarmusch, starring Tom Waits, John Lurie, Roberto BenigniDragon Ball: Curse of the Blood Rubies (Doragon Bōru Shenron no Densetsu) - (Japan)Duet for One, directed by Andrei Konchalovsky, starring Julie AndrewsDust in the Wind (Liàn liàn fēng chén) - (Taiwan)

EEcho Park, starring Tom Hulce and Susan DeyExtremities, starring Farrah Fawcett, Alfre Woodard, Diana Scarwid, James RussoEye of the Tiger, starring Gary Busey

FF/X, starring Bryan Brown and Brian DennehyFerris Bueller's Day Off, directed by John Hughes, starring Matthew Broderick, Mia Sara, Alan Ruck, Jennifer Grey, Jeffrey Jones, Charlie SheenFire with Fire, starring Craig Sheffer and Virginia MadsenFirewalker, starring Chuck NorrisFlight of the Navigator, directed by Randal Kleiser, starring Veronica Cartwright, Sarah Jessica Parker, Joey CramerFlodder, directed by Dick Maas - (Netherlands)The Fly, directed by David Cronenberg, starring Jeff Goldblum and Geena DavisFootrot Flats: The Dog's Tale - (New Zealand)Forbidden Dreams (Smrt krásných srnců) - (Czechoslovakia)Foreign Body, directed by Ronald Neame, starring Amanda Donohoe and Victor Banerjee - (U.K.)Friday the 13th Part VI: Jason Lives, directed by Tom McLoughlin, starring Thom Mathews and Jennifer CookeThe Fringe Dwellers, directed by Bruce Beresford - (Australia)

GGenesis, directed by Mrinal Sen, starring Shabana Azmi, Naseeruddin Shah, Om Puri, M. K. Raina (India / Switzerland / Belgium / France)Ginger and Fred, directed by Federico Fellini, starring Marcello Mastroianni and Giulietta Masina - (Italy)A Girl from Hunan (Xiāngnǔ xiāoxiāo) - (China)GoBots: Battle of the Rock Lords, featuring the voices of Margot Kidder, Telly Savalas and Roddy McDowallThe Golden Child, directed by Michael Ritchie, starring Eddie Murphy, Charles Dance, Charlotte LewisGonza the Spearman (Yari no gonza) - (Japan)Good to Go, starring Art GarfunkelGothic, directed by Ken Russell, starring Gabriel Byrne, Natasha Richardson, Julian SandsThe Great Mouse Detective, starring the voices of Vincent Price, Barrie Ingham, Val Bettin, Susanne Pollatschek, Candy Candido, Eve Brenner, Diana Chesney, Frank Welker, Alan Young, directed by John Musker, Ron Clements, David Michener, Burny MattinsonA Great Wall - (United States/China)The Green Ray (Le Rayon vert), directed by Éric Rohmer - Golden Lion award - (France)Gung Ho!, directed by Ron Howard, starring Michael Keaton

HHalf Moon Street, starring Sigourney Weaver and Michael Caine - (UK / US)Hamburger: The Motion Picture, starring Leigh McCloskey, Dick Butkus, Charles Tyner, Randi BrooksHannah and Her Sisters, directed by and starring Woody Allen, with Michael Caine, Mia Farrow, Dianne Wiest, Barbara HersheyHaunted Honeymoon, directed by and starring Gene Wilder, with Gilda Radner and Dom DeLuiseHeartbreak Ridge, directed by and starring Clint Eastwood, with Mario Van Peebles, Marsha Mason, Boyd GainesHeartburn, directed by Mike Nichols, starring Meryl Streep and Jack NicholsonHeat, starring Burt ReynoldsHeathcliff: The MovieHenry: Portrait of a Serial Killer, starring Michael RookerHibiscus Town (Fu rong zhen), directed by Xie Jin - (China)Highlander, directed by Russell Mulcahy, starring Christopher Lambert and Sean Connery - (UK / US)The Hitcher, directed by Robert Harmon, starring Rutger Hauer, C. Thomas Howell, Jennifer Jason LeighHoosiers, directed by David Anspaugh, starring Gene Hackman, Barbara Hershey, Dennis HopperThe Horse Thief (Dao ma zei) - (China)Hôtel du Paradis, starring Fernando Rey - (France)Hot Money, directed by Zale Magder, starring Michael Murphy and Orson WellesHouse, starring William Katt, Kay Lenz, George WendtHouse on Fire (Kataku no hito), starring Ken Ogata - (Japan)Howard the Duck, starring Lea Thompson, Jeffrey Jones, Tim RobbinsHyper Sapien: People from Another StarIInvaders from Mars, directed by Tobe HooperIron Eagle, starring Louis Gossett Jr. and Jason Gedrick

JJake Speed, starring Wayne Crawford, Dennis Christopher, John HurtJean de Florette, directed by Claude Berri, starring Gérard Depardieu, Yves Montand, Daniel Auteuil - (France)Jo Jo Dancer, Your Life Is Calling, directed by and starring Richard PryorJumpin' Jack Flash, directed by Penny Marshall, starring Whoopi Goldberg, Stephen Collins, Annie Potts, Jon Lovitz, Carol KaneJust Between Friends, starring Mary Tyler Moore, Christine Lahti, Ted Danson, Sam Waterston

KThe Karate Kid Part II, starring Ralph Macchio and Pat MoritaKarma, starring Dilip Kumar and Nutan - (India)A Killing Affair, directed by David Saperstein, starring Peter Weller, Kathy Baker, John Glover, and Bill SmitrovichKin-dza-dza! - (U.S.S.R.)Knights of the CityLLabyrinth, directed by Jim Henson, starring David Bowie and Jennifer Connelly - (UK / US)Lady Jane, directed by Trevor Nunn, starring Helena Bonham Carter, Cary Elwes, Patrick Stewart - (U.K.)Laputa: Castle in the Sky (Tenkū no Shiro Rapyuta) - (Japan)Legal Eagles, directed by Ivan Reitman, starring Robert Redford, Debra Winger and Daryl HannahLet's Get Harry, starring Robert DuvallLink, starring Terence Stamp and Elisabeth Shue - (UK)Little Shop of Horrors, directed by Frank Oz, starring Rick Moranis, Ellen Greene, Steve Martin and the voice of Levi StubbsLove Me Forever or Never (Eu Sei Que Vou Te Amar) - (Brazil)
 Loyalties, directed by Anne Wheeler, starring Kenneth Welsh, and Susan Wooldridge (Canada/U.K.)Lucas, starring Corey Haim, Kerri Green, Charlie Sheen, Winona RyderLuxo Jr.MMalcolm - (Australia)The Manhattan Project, starring John Lithgow, Christopher Collet, Cynthia NixonManhunter, directed by Michael Mann, starring William Petersen, Kim Greist, Dennis Farina, Tom Noonan, Joan Allen and Brian Cox (as Hannibal Lecter)Manon des Sources, directed by Claude Berri, starring Yves Montand, Daniel Auteuil, Emmanuelle Béart - (France)Martial Arts of Shaolin (Nan bei Shao Lin), starring Jet Li - (Hong Kong)Matador, directed by Pedro Almodóvar, starring Antonio Banderas - (Spain)Mauvais Sang (Bad Blood), starring Michel Piccoli and Juliette Binoche - (France)Maximum Overdrive, directed by Stephen King, starring Emilio Estevez, featuring a soundtrack by AC/DCMeatballs III: Summer Job, directed by George Mendeluk, starring Sally Kellerman, Patrick Dempsey, and Al WaxmanThe Men's Club, starring Roy Scheider, Harvey Keitel, Craig Wasson, David Dukes, Frank Langella, Treat WilliamsMiracles, starring Tom Conti and Teri Garr - (UK / US)The Mission, directed by Roland Joffé, starring Robert De Niro, Jeremy Irons, Ray McAnally - Palme d'Or award - (U.K.)Modern Girls, starring Virginia MadsenMona Lisa, directed by Neil Jordan, starring Bob Hoskins, Cathy Tyson, Michael Caine - (U.K.)
 Motherland Hotel, directed by Ömer Kavur, starring Macit Koper, Şahika Tekand, Serra Yılmaz, Orhan Çağman (Turkey)The Money Pit, directed by Richard Benjamin, starring Tom Hanks and Shelley LongMonster in the Closet, starring Claude Akins, Henry Gibson, Paul Dooley, Stella StevensThe Morning After, directed by Sidney Lumet, starring Jane Fonda and Jeff BridgesThe Moro Affair (Il Caso Moro), directed by Giuseppe Ferrara, starring Gian Maria Volonté - (Italy)The Mosquito Coast, directed by Peter Weir, starring Harrison Ford, Helen Mirren, River PhoenixMr. Bharath - (India)Murder in Three Acts, starring Peter Ustinov, Tony Curtis, Emma SammsMurphy's Law, starring Charles BronsonMy Chauffeur, starring Deborah ForemanMy Little Girl, directed by Connie Kaiserman, starring Mary Stuart Masterson and James Earl JonesMy Little Pony: The Movie, starring Danny DeVito, Rhea Perlman, Madeline Kahn

NNaam (Name), starring Nutan and Sanjay Dutt - (India)The Name of the Rose, directed by Jean-Jacques Annaud, starring Sean Connery, F. Murray Abraham, Christian Slater - (West Germany/Italy/France)'night, Mother, starring Sissy Spacek and Anne BancroftNight of the Pencils (La noche de los lápices) - (Argentina)No Mercy, starring Kim Basinger and Richard GereNomads, starring Pierce Brosnan and Lesley-Anne DownNothing in Common, directed by Garry Marshall, starring Tom Hanks, Jackie Gleason, Eva Marie Saint, Héctor Elizondo, Barry Corbin, Sela Ward

OOff Beat, starring Judge ReinholdOld Well (Lao jing) - (China)One Crazy Summer, starring John Cusack, Demi Moore, Bobcat GoldthwaitOne More Saturday Night, starring Al FrankenOn the Edge, starring Bruce Dern and Pam GrierOtello, directed by Franco Zeffirelli, starring Plácido Domingo - (Italy)Out of Bounds, starring Anthony Michael Hall and Jenny Wright

PThe Park Is Mine, starring Tommy Lee JonesParting Glances, starring Steve BuscemiThe Patriot, starring Gregg Henry and Jeff ConawayPeggy Sue Got Married, directed by Francis Ford Coppola, starring Kathleen Turner and Nicolas CagePeking Opera Blues (Dao ma dan), directed by Tsui Hark - (Hong Kong)The Pied Piper (Krysař) - (Czechoslovakia)Pirates, directed by Roman Polanski, starring Walter Matthau - (France / Tunisia)Platoon, directed by Oliver Stone, starring Charlie Sheen, Tom Berenger, Willem Dafoe - Academy and Golden Globe (drama) Awards for Best PicturePoltergeist II: The Other Side, starring Craig T. NelsonPoor Butterfly (Pobre mariposa) - (Argentina)Power, directed by Sidney Lumet, starring Richard Gere, Denzel Washington, Julie Christie, Kate Capshaw, Fritz Weaver, E. G. Marshall, Gene HackmanPretty in Pink, directed by Howard Deutch, starring Molly Ringwald, Andrew McCarthy, Jon Cryer, James SpaderProject A-ko - (Japan)A Promise (Ningen no yakusoku) - (Japan)Psycho III, directed by and starring Anthony Perkins, Diana Scarwid and Jeff Fahey

QQuicksilver, starring Kevin BaconQuiet Cool, starring James Remar

RRad, directed by Hal NeedhamRaw Deal, starring Arnold SchwarzeneggerRed Headed Stranger, starring Willie Nelson and Morgan FairchildRegalo di Natale (Christmas Present) - (Italy)Rita, Sue and Bob Too - (U.K.)River's Edge, directed by Tim Hunter, starring Crispin Glover, Keanu Reeves, Ione Skye, Dennis HopperRobotech: The Movie, directed by Carl Macek and Noboru Ishiguro - (United States / Japan)Rosa Luxemburg, directed by Margarethe von Trotta, starring Barbara Sukowa - (West Germany)Round Midnight, directed by Bertrand Tavernier, starring Dexter Gordon - (United States / France)Running Scared, directed by Peter Hyams, starring Gregory Hines and Billy CrystalRuthless People, directed by Jim Abrahams, starring Danny DeVito, Bette Midler, Judge Reinhold, Helen Slater, Bill Pullman

SThe Sacrifice (Offret), directed by Andrei Tarkovsky - (Sweden/U.K./France)Salvador, directed by Oliver Stone, starring James Woods, James Belushi, Michael MurphySarraounia - (Burkina Faso/France/Mauritania)Saving Grace, starring Tom ContiSay Yes, directed by Larry Yust, starring Lissa Layng, Art Hindle, Logan Ramsey, Jonathan WintersScene of the Crime (Le lieu du crime), directed by André Téchiné, starring Catherine Deneuve - (France)The Sea and Poison (Umi to dokuyaku) - (Japan)Seize the Day, starring Robin WilliamsShadows in Paradise, directed by ||Aki Kaurismäki Shanghai Surprise, directed by Jim Goddard, starring Madonna and Sean Penn - (U.K.)She's Gotta Have It, directed by Spike LeeShort Circuit, directed by John Badham, starring Ally Sheedy and Steve GuttenbergSid and Nancy, directed by Alex Cox, starring Gary Oldman and Chloe Webb - (U.K.)Solarbabies, starring Jason Patric, Jami Gertz, Richard Jordan, Lukas HaasSomething Wild, directed by Jonathan Demme, starring Jeff Daniels, Melanie Griffith, Ray LiottaSoul Man, starring C. Thomas Howell, Rae Dawn Chong, James Earl JonesSpaceCamp, starring Kate Capshaw, Lea Thompson and Kelly PrestonStammheim (aka Stammheim - Die Baader-Meinhof-Gruppe vor Gericht) - Golden Bear award - (West Germany)Stand by Me, directed by Rob Reiner, starring River Phoenix, Wil Wheaton, Corey Feldman, Jerry O'ConnellStar Trek IV: The Voyage Home, directed by and starring Leonard Nimoy, with William Shatner and Catherine HicksStewardess School, starring Brett Cullen and Don MostStreets of Gold, starring Wesley Snipes and Klaus Maria BrandauerStripperA Successful Man (Un hombre de éxito) - (Cuba)Sweet Liberty, directed by and starring Alan Alda, with Michelle Pfeiffer, Michael Caine, Bob Hoskins, Lois Chiles, Lise Hilboldt, Lillian Gish

TTai-Pan, starring Bryan Brown and Joan ChenTenue de soirée (Evening Dress), directed by Bertrand Blier, starring Gérard Depardieu, Michel Blanc, Miou-Miou - (France)Terrorizers (Kong bu fen zi) - (Taiwan)TerrorVision, starring Gerrit Graham and Chad AllenThe Texas Chainsaw Massacre 2, starring Dennis HopperThat's Life!, directed by Blake Edwards, starring Jack Lemmon and Julie AndrewsThree Amigos, directed by John Landis, starring Steve Martin, Martin Short, Chevy ChaseTiempo de Silencio (Time of Silence), starring Victoria Abril - (Spain)Time After Time, starring John Gielgud and Googie Withers - (U.K./Australia)Toby McTeague - (Canada)Top Gun, directed by Tony Scott, starring Tom Cruise, Kelly McGillis, Val Kilmer, Anthony Edwards, Tom SkerrittTouch and Go, starring Michael KeatonTough Guys, starring Burt Lancaster, Kirk Douglas, Dana Carvey, Darlanne Fluegel, Alexis Smith, Eli WallachThe Transformers: The Movie, starring Eric Idle, Judd Nelson, Orson WellesIn a Glass Cage (Tras el Cristal) - (Spain)Trick or Treat, starring Marc Price, Gene Simmons, Ozzy OsbourneTroll, starring Michael MoriartyTrue Stories, directed by and starring David Byrne

UUnder the Cherry Moon, directed by and starring Prince, with Jerome Benton and Kristin Scott Thomas

VVamp, starring Grace JonesVera, directed by Sérgio Toledo, starring Ana Beatriz Nogueira, Norma Blum, Raul Cortez, and Carlos Kroeber (Brazil)Violets Are Blue, starring Sissy Spacek and Kevin KlineVoyage to Nowhere (El viaje a ninguna parte) - (Spain)

WWahnfried (Richard und Cosima) - (West Germany)When the Wind Blows, starring John Mills and Peggy Ashcroft - (U.K.)Wildcats, starring Goldie Hawn, Nipsey Russell, Wesley Snipes, Woody Harrelson, LL Cool JWisdom, directed by and starring Emilio Estevez, with Demi MooreDe Wisselwachter (The Pointsman) - (Netherlands)Working Girls, directed by Lizzie Borden, starring Louise SmithThe Wraith, starring Charlie Sheen and Sherilyn Fenn

XX: The Unheard MusicYThe Year of Enlightenment (El Año de las Luces) - (Spain)Youngblood, starring Rob Lowe, Patrick Swayze, Cynthia Gibb

Births
 January 4 - Charlyne Yi, American actor, comedian, musician and writer
 January 5 - Deepika Padukone, Indian actress
 January 16 - Mason Gamble, American former actor
 January 21
Sushant Singh Rajput, Indian actor (d. 2020)
Ken Yamamura, Japanese actor
 January 24
Mischa Barton, English-American actress
Raviv Ullman, Israeli actor
 January 30 - Ashley Buccille, American actress
 February 1 - Lauren Conrad, American TV personality and author
 February 2 - Gemma Arterton, English actress
 February 6 - Dane DeHaan, American actor
 February 9 - Jade Xu, actress
 February 12 - Valorie Curry, American actress
 February 14 - Tiffany Thornton, American actress, comedian, and singer-songwriter
 February 18 - Sakura Ando, Japanese actress
 February 19
Ophelia Lovibond, English actress
Maria Mena, Norwegian singer
 February 22 - Josh Helman, Australian actor
 February 24 - Bryce Papenbrook, American voice actor
 February 25
Jameela Jamil, English actress
James and Oliver Phelps, English twin actors
 February 26 - Teresa Palmer. Australian actress, writer, model and film producer
 March 9 - Brittany Snow, American actress
 March 14 - Jamie Bell, English actor and dancer.
 March 15 - Jai Courtney, Australian actor
 March 16 - Alexandra Daddario, American actress
 March 17 - Olesya Rulin, Russian-American actress
 March 20 - Ruby Rose, Australian actress
 March 21 - Scott Eastwood, American actor and model
 March 22 - Matt Bush, American actor
 March 28 - Lady Gaga, American singer and actress
 March 30 - Simon Baker, Aboriginal-Canadian actor
 April 3 - Amanda Bynes, American actress and variety show host
 April 9 - Leighton Meester, American actress and singer
 April 12 - Titanilla Bogdányi, Hungarian voice actress
 April 15 - Ester Dean, American singer-songwriter and actress
 April 17 - Zheng Kai, Chinese actor and television personality
 April 19 - Henrik Kalmet, Estonian actor
 April 22 - Amber Heard, American actress
 April 23 - Alisha Morrison, Canadian actress
 April 24 - Tahyna MacManus, Australian actress, director, writer and producer
 April 25
John DeLuca, American actor and singer
Daniel Sharman, English actor
 April 27 - Jenna Coleman, English actress
 April 30 - Dianna Agron, American actress, singer and director
 May 3 - Pom Klementieff, French actress and model
 May 6 - Sasheer Zamata, American actress and comedienne
 May 7 - Robbie Jarvis, British actor
 May 11 - Tia Ballard, American voice actress
 May 12 - Emily VanCamp, Canadian actress
 May 13
Lena Dunham, American writer, director, actress, and producer
Robert Pattinson, English actor
 May 16 - Megan Fox, American actress and model
 May 17 - Tahj Mowry, American actor
 May 19 - Eric Lloyd, American actor, comedian, musician and producer
 May 21
David Ajala, British actor
Da'Vine Joy Randolph, American actress and singer
 May 23 - Ryan Coogler, American filmmaker
 May 28 - Joseph Cross (actor), American actor and producer
 May 30 - Will Peltz, American actor
 June 1 - Alessio Puccio, Italian voice actor
 June 3
Brenden Jefferson, American child actor and songwriter
Josh Segarra, American actor
 June 4 - Oona Chaplin, Spanish-British actress
 June 11 - Shia LaBeouf, American actor, performance artist, and filmmaker
 June 12 - Luke Youngblood, English actor
 June 13 
Kat Dennings, American actress
Mary-Kate and Ashley Olsen, American twin actresses and entrepreneurs
 June 14 - Haley Hudson, American actress
 June 17 - Marie Avgeropoulos, Canadian actress and model
 June 18 - Richard Madden, Scottish actor
 June 19
Nazareno Casero, Argentinian actor
Erin Mackey, American actress and singer
 June 20 - Dreama Walker, American retired actress
 June 26 - Brittney Karbowski, American voice actress
 June 27
Drake Bell, American actor, comedian, musician, singer-songwriter and record producer
Sam Claflin, British actor
 July 1 - Sonoya Mizuno, British actress
 July 2 - Lindsay Lohan, American actress, singer, songwriter, producer, and entrepreneur
 July 8 - Jake McDorman, American actor
 July 10 - Wyatt Russell, American actor
 July 15 - Yahya Abdul-Mateen II, American actor
 July 17 - Brando Eaton, American actor
 July 26 - Saphira Indah, Indonesian actress (d. 2019)
 July 27 - Felecia Angelle, American voice actress
 August 6 - Nanna Blondell, Swedish actress
 August 13 - Ashley Spillers, American actress
 August 14 - Casey LaBow, American actress and producer
 August 16 - Shawn Pyfrom, American actor and singer
 August 17 - Katia Elizarova, Russian model and actress
 August 22 - Keiko Kitagawa, Japanese actress
 August 27 - Jack Kesy, American actor
 August 28 - Armie Hammer, American actor
 August 29 - Lea Michele, American actress and singer
 August 31 - Ryan Kelley, American actor
 September 12
Alfie Allen, English actor
Emmy Rossum, American actress and singer
 September 14 - A. J. Trauth, American actor and musician
 September 16
Kyla Pratt, American actress
Michael James Shaw, American actor and writer
 September 17 - Yoshitsugu Matsuoka, Japanese voice actor
 September 19  
Carrie Finlay, Canadian actress 
Peter Vack, American actor, writer, director and producer
 September 20 - Aldis Hodge, American actor
 September 23
Kaylee DeFer, American former actress
Jana Pérez, Spanish actress and model
 September 30 - Ki Hong Lee, Korean-American actor
 October 1
Sayaka Kanda, Japanese actress, voice actress and singer (d. 2021)
Jurnee Smollett, American actress
 October 2 - Camilla Belle, American actress, director, and producer
 October 3 - Joonas Suotamo, Finnish actor
 October 5 - Kevin Bigley, American actor
 October 6 - Luisa D'Oliveira, Canadian actress
 October 12 - Rafal Zawierucha, Polish actor
 October 13 - Tom Attenborough, English voice actor
 October 15 - Ali Fazal, Indian actor
 October 22 - Kyle Gallner, American actor
 October 23 - Emilia Clarke, British actress
 October 24 
Drake, Canadian rapper, singer, and actor
Nobuhiko Okamoto, Japanese voice actor and singer
 October 28 - Aditi Rao Hydari, Indian actress
 November 1 - Penn Badgley, American actor
 November 4 - Alexz Johnson, Canadian singer-songwriter, record producer, actress and philanthropist
 November 10 - Josh Peck, American actor
 November 14 - Cory Michael Smith, American actor
 November 15 - Winston Duke, Tobagonian actor
 November 18
Pablo Lyle, Mexican actor  
Ragne Veensalu, Estonian actress
 November 21 - Colleen Ballinger, American comedian, YouTuber, actress, singer and writer
 November 25 - Katie Cassidy, American actress and singer
 November 26 - Trevor Morgan (actor), American actor
 November 28 - Johnny Simmons, American actor
 December 17 - Emma Bell, American actress
 December 26 - Kit Harington, English actor
 December 30 - Ellie Goulding, English singer and songwriter
 December 31 - Bronson Pelletier, Canadian actor

Deaths

 Film debuts 
Angela Bassett - F/XSean Bean - CaravaggioEwen Bremner - Heavenly PursuitsTia Carrere - Zombie NightmareDan Castellaneta - Nothing in CommonKim Coates - The Boy in BlueDave Foley - High StakesTony Goldwyn - Friday the 13th Part VI: Jason LivesCaroline Goodall - Every Time We Say GoodbyeTim Guinee - Tai-PanWoody Harrelson - WildcatsSean Hayes - LucasCatherine Keener - About Last NightRichard Kind - Nothing in CommonOlek Krupa - 91/2 WeeksJames LeGros - The Ladies ClubTed Levine - One More Saturday NightJennifer Lopez - My Little GirlJon Lovitz - Hamburger: The Motion PictureNatasha Lyonne - HeartburnMarlee Matlin - Children of a Lesser GodJohn C. McGinley - Sweet LibertyJanet McTeer - Half Moon StreetBen Mendelsohn - The Still PointJerry O'Connell - Stand by MeMiranda Otto - Emma's WarAdrian Pasdar - Top GunJason Patric - SolarbabiesVincent Perez - Gardien de la nuitElizabeth Perkins - About Last NightMax Perlich - Ferris Bueller's Day OffJoaquin Phoenix - SpaceCampWendell Pierce - The Money PitJeremy Piven - LucasBill Pullman - Ruthless PeopleVing Rhames - Native SonMichael Rooker - Henry: Portrait of a Serial KillerWinona Ryder - LucasKristin Scott Thomas - Under the Cherry MoonTony Shalhoub - HeartburnIone Skye - River's EdgeJimmy Smits - Running ScaredWesley Snipes - WildcatsKevin Spacey - HeartburnImelda Staunton - ComradesKristy Swanson - Pretty in PinkD.B. Sweeney - PowerTilda Swinton - CaravaggioCary-Hiroyuki Tagawa - Armed ResponseBilly Bob Thornton - Hunter's BloodTony Todd – SleepwalkPaul Walker - Monster in the ClosetNaomi Watts - For Love AloneBradley Whitford - DoormanRobin Wright - Hollywood Vice SquadKari Wuhrer - Fire with Fire''

See also

 List of American films of 1986
 List of British films of 1986
 List of French films of 1986
 List of German films of the 1980s
 List of Bollywood films of 1986
 List of Italian films of 1986
 List of Japanese films of 1986
 List of Swedish films of the 1980s

References 

 
Film by year